The Belarusian State Academy of Music (Беларуская дзяржаўная акадэмія музыкі) is the primary music and higher education institution and research center of musicology, folklore, aesthetics, music pedagogy in Belarus, based in Minsk. 

Minsk had earlier had a conservatory, Minsk Conservatory. It was founded in 1932 and up to 1992 was known as the Belarusian State Conservatory. In 2000 the Belarusian Academy of Music was granted status as the leading institution of the national system of education in the field of musical art, alongside the Belarusian State Academy of Arts.

Rectors
 M. Kazakov (1932-1933)
 J. Pris (1933-1934)
 Konstantin Bogushevich (1934-1936)
 Oscar Gantman (1937-1938)
 Mikhail Berger (1938-1941)
 Nikolai Aladov (1944-1948)
 Anatoly Bogatyrev (1948-1962)
 Vladimir Olovnikov (1962-1982)
 Igor Luchenok (1982-1985)
 Mikhail Kozinets (1985-2005)
 Alexander Rashchupkin (2005-2010)
 Ekaterina Dulova (2010-2022)
 Elena Kurakina (2022-present)

Notable alumni
 Mieczysław Weinberg - taught and studied composition 1939-41 
 Anatoly Bogatyrev - composer, founder of the modern Belarusian school of composition, a professor of the Belarusian State Music Academy, People's Artist of Belarus
 Angelina Tkatcheva - virtuoso cimbalom player
 Igor Luchenok - composer, People's Artist of the USSR
 Dmitry Smolski -  composer, guitarist and composer, father of Victor Smolski
 Maria Kalesnikava - Music teacher, political activist
 Vyacheslav Kuznetsov - Belarusian composer
 Yadviga Poplavskaya - singer, member of the group "Verasy"
  - violinist
 Marina Starostenkova - pianist, concertmaster and music teacher
 Eta Tyrmand, composer and music teacher

Notable teachers
 Anatoly Bogatyrev - the founder of the modern Belarusian school of composition, composer, educator, social activist, Distinguished Artist of the Byelorussian SSR (1940), winner of the State Prize (1941), Honored Artist of the Byelorussian SSR (1944)
 Eta Tyrmand, composer and music teacher
 Vladimir Perlin - cellist, Professor, Honored Artist of the Republuc of Belarus
 Leonid Petrovich Yushkevich - Professor, pianist, piano teacher

References

External links 

Belarusian State Academy of Music
Educational institutions established in 1932
1932 establishments in Belarus